Gargalianoi is a town and a former municipality in Messenia, Peloponnese, Greece. Since the 2011 local government reform it is part of the municipality Trifylia, of which it is a municipal unit. The municipal unit has an area of 122.680 km2. The Greek National Road 9 (Patras - Pyrgos - Pylos) passes through the town.

Subdivisions
The municipal unit Gargalianoi is subdivided into the following communities:
Floka
Gargalianoi
Lefki
Marathopoli
Mouzaki
Pyrgos
Valta
Tragana

Famous inhabitants
 Theophrastos Anagnostopoulos, who later anglicized his name to Theodore Agnew, father of United States Vice President Spiro Agnew
 Tellos Agras, Officer of the Hellenic Army during the Greek Struggle for Macedonia
 Theophilos III of Jerusalem, Patriarch of Jerusalem, born Ηλίας Γιαννόπουλος in Gargalianoi in 1952

Historical population

References

External links
https://web.archive.org/web/20100113100940/http://www.gargaliani.gov.gr/ (in Greek)

See also
List of settlements in Messenia

Populated places in Messenia